The Pines  may refer to:

Australia 

 The Pines, Elanora, a shopping centre in Queensland
 The Pines, Queensland, a locality 
 The Pines, South Australia, a locality 
 Frankston North, a suburb of Melbourne
 The Pines Shopping Centre in Melbourne

New Zealand 

 The Pines Beach, a beach town in Canterbury

United Kingdom 
 The Pines, Putney, a Grade II listed house in Putney, London

United States

Alabama 
 The Pines (Anniston, Alabama), a house on the National Register of Historic Places

Arkansas 
 The Pines, Arkansas, an unincorporated community

California 

 The Pines, San Bernardino County, California

Florida 
 The Pines (Miami), a neighborhood within the city of Miami

New York 
 The Pines (Lyons Falls, New York), a house on the National Register of Historic Places
 The Pines (Pine Plains, New York), a house on the National Register of Historic Places
 Fire Island Pines, a hamlet on Fire Island

Texas 
 Lake O' the Pines, a reservoir in Marion County
 The Pines Catholic Camp, a Catholic summer camp and retreat center in Big Sandy, Texas

Virginia 
 The Pines, Virginia

Other uses
 Os Pinos, the official Galician anthem

See also 
 Pine (disambiguation)
 Pines (disambiguation)